Bo Niclas Adler (born 30 April 1971) is a Swedish entrepreneur, scientist, founder and CEO for Synthesis Group. As an entrepreneur he has built several biopharma and medical technology companies as well as both VC and PE funds dedicated to life-sciences. As a management researcher he is known for his work on "Managing complex product development" and on "Collaborative research in organizations."

Biography 
Adler obtained his MBA at the Stockholm School of Economics in 1994, where in 1999 he also obtained his PhD with the thesis, entitled "Managing complex product development: Three approaches."

Adler started his academic career both at Stockholm School of Economics and the Chalmers University of Technology in 1994, where he was Associate Professor and Director of FENIX until 2005. FENIX was a research institute built in close collaboration with Ericsson, Telia, Volvo and AstraZeneca to leverage the opportunities with digitalization. In cooperation with the Stockholm School of Economics in 1996 he co-founded its Center for Management Innovations, and was Program Director and Fellow until 2005. In 1998 he also co-founded the Stockholm School of Entrepreneurship, and was its Executive Director for two years.

From 2007 to 2011 he was professor of Jönköping International Business School, as well as its CEO and its dean. In 2011 he was appointed Babson Global Professor of Entrepreneurship Practice at Babson College in the United States. In 2012 he is appointed professor at and president of the IPMI International business school, professor and president for Indonesia International Institute for Life-sciences, i3L and back in Sweden Adjunct Professor of Entrepreneurship at the Royal College of Music in Stockholm.

Adler have co-founded 25 technology, compute and innovation-based companies, including Synthesis Group, iPower Group, Immune Therapy Holdings, TLA Targeted Immuno Therapies, Immuno Diagnostics, Immune System Regulation in Stockholm, True Point in Boston, E-Cognition in Singapore and Accelerated Innovation Group in Hong Kong. Adler is chairman and board members in several technology and innovation based companies including Chairman for NASDAQ listed Karolinska Development and he was the founding Chairman for NGT Partners that manages VC and PE funds dedicated to life-science companies and technologies.

Selected publications 
 Adler, Niclas. Managing complex product development: Three approaches. (1999).
 Shani, A.B., Mohrman, S.A., Pasmore, W.A., Stymne, B., & Adler, N. (Eds.). (2007). Handbook of collaborative management research: foundations for learning, change, and theoretical development. Sage Publications.
 Adler, N., Shani, A., Styhre, A. (2003). Collaborative research in organizations: foundations for learning, change, and theoretical development London: SAGE

Articles, a selection:
 Adler, Niclas, and Peter Docherty. "Bringing business into sociotechnical theory and practice." Human Relations 51.3 (1998): 319–345.
 Jacob, M., Hellström, T., Adler, N., & Norrgren, F. (2000). "From sponsorship to partnership in academy‐industry relations." R&D Management, 30(3), 255–262.
 Pasmore, W. A., Stymne, B., Shani, A. B., Mohrman, S. A., & Adler, N. (2008). "The promise of collaborative management research." in: Handbook of collaborative management research, 7-31.
 Adler, N., Elmquist, M., Norrgren, F. (2009). The challenge of managing boundary-spanning research activities: Experiences from the Swedish context, Research Policy 38(7), 1136–1149. 
 Adler, N., Glassér, C., af Klinteberg, B. (2005). A collaborative research effort to bridge boundaries and support deviant youths in contemporary welfare systems, European Management Review 2(1), 88–99. *
 Adler, N., Beer, M. (2008). Collaborative R&D in Management: The Practical Experience of Fenix and TruePoint in Bridging the Divide between Scientific and Managerial Goals Handbook of collaborative management research Los Angeles, Calif.: Sage Publications. 
 Mohrman, S., Pasmore, W., Shani, A., Stymne, B., Adler, N. (2008). Toward Building a Collaborative Research Community Handbook of collaborative management research Los Angeles, Calif.: Sage Publications. 
 Foster, J., Hildén, M., Adler, N. (2006). Can Regulations Induce Environmental Innovations?: An Analysis of the Role of Regulations in the Pulp and Paper Industry in Selected Industrialized Countries Innovation, science, and institutional change New York: Oxford University Press. *
 Adler, N., Norrgren, F. (2003). Collaborative research: strategic intents and actual practices Collaborative research in organizations: foundations for learning, change, and theoretical development (pp. 54-68). London: SAGE. 
 Adler, N., Shani, A., Styhre, A. (2003). Collaborative research in organizations: lessons and challenges Collaborative research in organizations: foundations for learning, change, and theoretical development (pp. 343-361). London: SAGE. 
 Adler, N., Shani, A. (2001). In search of an alternative framework for the creation of actionable knowledge: table-tennis research at Ericsson Research in Organizational Change and Development Greenwich, Conn.: JAI Press. *
 Adler, N., Hellström, T., Jacob, M., Norrgren, F. (2000). A Model for Institutionalizion of University-Industry Partnerships: The FENIX Research Program The future of knowledge production in the academy Buckingham: Open University Press.
 Adler, N., Docherty, P. (1995). STS and the Development of the Knowledge-based Organisation Organisatoriskt lärande: en antologi från projektet Utveckling av nyckelkompetenser för individer och företag Göteborg: Institute for Management of Innovation Technology.

References

External links 
https://web.archive.org/web/20170701013706/http://www.karolinskadevelopment.com/en/company/board/
http://accelerated.partners
babsonglobal.org/home/about/experts/niclas-adler/

1971 births
Living people
Swedish business theorists
Stockholm School of Economics alumni
Academic staff of the Stockholm School of Economics
Academic staff of the Chalmers University of Technology